Gavgol-e Qaleh (also Romanized as Gāvgol-e Qal‘eh; also known as Gāvkol, Gāvkol-e Pā’īn, and Gāvkol-e Soflá) is a village in Gamasiyab Rural District, in the Central District of Sahneh County, Kermanshah Province, Iran. At the 2006 census, its population was 199, in 45 families.

References 

Populated places in Sahneh County